is a town located in Oshima Subprefecture, Hokkaido, Japan.

Geography
Shikabe is located in northeast of Oshima Peninsula. There is Hokkaido Koma-ga-take on northwest of the town.

The name of "Shikabe" is derived from Ainu word "sikerpe", meaning "Place with Phellodendron amurense".

Neighboring municipalities
 Hakodate
 Mori
 Nanae

Demographics
On August 1, 2019, the town had an estimated population of 3,920 and a density of 37 persons per km².

History
1666: Ito Genguro, Shogunate of Tsugaru, discovers a deer healing itself in a hot spring in the area now called Shikabe. The legend of Shikabe Onsen begins. 
1906: Shikabe became a Second Class village.
1945: Hakodate Main Line Sawara Branch Line and Shikabe Station were opened.
1983: Shikabe village became Shikabe town.
1990: The founding of Shikabe Park.

Education
 Shikabe Junior High School
 Shikabe Elementary School

Economy 
The economy of Shikabe is dominated by fishing, with 3 large and small fishing ports in the town. The sea animals fished in Shikabe are octopus, pleuronectidae (righteyed flounder), okhotsk atka mackerel, salmon, as well as sea cucumber. During the wintertime, Shikabe's famous pollack roe is produced. 

Besides fishing, Shikabe has many onsen, as well as a Michi no Eki where visitors can relax with a warm foot bath. In the general area, there are various hotels and ryokan for visitors to stay at.

Fisheries 
 Honbetsu Fishery
 Shikabe Fishery

Post Offices 
 Shikabe Post Office

Delivery Companies 
 Yamato 
 Segawa
 Japan Post

Transportation 
 Hakodate Main Line: Shikabe Station
 Hakodate Bus: Shikabe Branch Office
 Japan National Route 278

References

External links

Official Website 

Towns in Hokkaido